The 2011–12 Liga de Nuevos Talentos season was split in two tournaments Apertura and Clausura. Liga de Nuevos Talentos was the fourth–tier football league of Mexico. The season was played between 12 August 2011 and 27 May 2012.

Teams

Group 1 
{{Location map+ |Mexico |width=650|float=right |caption=Location of teams in the 2011–12 LNT Group 1 |places=

Group 2 
{{Location map+ |Mexico |width=700|float=right |caption=Location of teams in the 2011–12 LNT Group 2 |places=

Changes during the season
 Orinegros de Ciudad Madero only played the first 8 games, then retired.
 On December 22, 2011, the FMF disaffiliated the Club Indios de Ciudad Juárez, with this, its affiliate team, a participant in this division, was also disqualified and did not play the Clausura 2012 tournament.

Torneo Apertura

Regular season

Group 1

Standings

Results

Group 2

Standings

Results

Liguilla 
The eight best teams of each group play two games against each other on a home-and-away basis. The higher seeded teams play on their home field during the second leg. The winner of each match up is determined by aggregate score. In the round of 16, quarterfinals and semifinals, if the two teams are tied on aggregate the higher seeded team advances. In the final, if the two teams are tied after both legs, the match goes to extra time and, if necessary, a penalty shoot-out.

Round of 16

First leg

Second leg

Quarter-finals

First leg

Second leg

Semi-finals

First leg

Second leg

Final

First leg

Second leg

Torneo Clausura

Regular season

Group 1

Standings

Results

Group 2

Standings

Results

Liguilla 
The eight best teams of each group play two games against each other on a home-and-away basis. The higher seeded teams play on their home field during the second leg. The winner of each match up is determined by aggregate score. In the round of 16, quarterfinals and semifinals, if the two teams are tied on aggregate the higher seeded team advances. In the final, if the two teams are tied after both legs, the match goes to extra time and, if necessary, a penalty shoot-out.

Round of 16

First leg

Second leg

Quarter-finals

First leg

Second leg

Semi-finals

First leg

Second leg

Final

First leg

Second leg

Relegation Table 

Last updated: 21 April 2012 Source: Segunda División FMFP = Position; G = Games played; Pts = Points; Pts/G = Ratio of points to games played

Promotion Final
The Promotion Final is a series of matches played by the champions of the tournaments Apertura and Clausura, the game was played to determine the winning team of the promotion to Liga Premier de Ascenso. 
The first leg was played on 23 May 2012, and the second leg was played on 26 May 2012.

First leg

Second leg

See also 
2011–12 Mexican Primera División season
2011–12 Liga de Ascenso season
2011–12 Liga Premier de Ascenso season

References

External links 
 Official website of Liga Premier
 Magazine page 

 
1